Seminole Rest (also known as the Snyder Hill or Oak Hill or Live Oak Hill) is a historic site in Oak Hill, Florida, United States. It is located east of State Road 5, on the western shore of Mosquito Lagoon, and is part of the Canaveral National Seashore. On March 19, 1997, it was added to the U.S. National Register of Historic Places.

References and external links

 Volusia County listings at National Register of Historic Places
 Seminole Rest at Florida's Office of Cultural and Historical Programs

Houses on the National Register of Historic Places in Volusia County, Florida
Indian River Lagoon